The Court at 732-744 Santa Barbara St. is a bungalow court located at 732-744 Santa Barbara St. in Pasadena, California. The original court includes three buildings containing five residential units surrounding a central courtyard. Contractor D. Hoffman built the court in 1922. The homes in the court were designed in the Spanish Colonial Revival style and feature porches with tile roofs atop columns and broken parapets along their roofs. A sixth building at 738 Santa Barbara was added in 1956; this building is not considered part of the historic court.

The court was added to the National Register of Historic Places on July 11, 1983.

References

External links

Bungalow courts
Houses in Pasadena, California
Houses completed in 1922
Houses on the National Register of Historic Places in California
National Register of Historic Places in Pasadena, California
Spanish Colonial Revival architecture in California